The 2012 BWF Super Series was the sixth season of the BWF Super Series. The season started with a Super Series Premier event in Korea and ended in Hong Kong. The season-ending Masters Finals were held in Shenzhen, China from December 12–16, 2012.

Schedule
Below is the schedule released by the Badminton World Federation:

Results

Winners

Performance by countries
Tabulated below are the Super Series performances based on countries. Only countries who have won a title are listed:

Finals

Korea

Malaysia

All England

India

Indonesia

Singapore

China Masters

Japan

Denmark

France

China Open

Hong Kong

Masters Finals

References

 
BWF Super Series